Lefkimmi (also known as Alefkimmo) is a town and a former municipality on the island of Corfu, Ionian Islands, Greece. Since the 2019 local government reform it is part of the municipality South Corfu, of which it is a municipal unit. Its land area is 50.819 km² and its population was 5,800 at the 2011 census.  Lefkimmi is the southernmost municipal unit on the island. Tourism is its main industry along with agriculture and other businesses. It features beaches, restaurants, shops, taverns and hotels. A canal passes through the eastern part of town. The municipal seat was the town of Lefkímmi (pop. 2,935). Its next largest towns are Kávos (pop. 685), Palaiochóri (459), Vitaládes (442), and Kritiká (453). Lefkimmi also is the second largest settlement of the island.

Subdivisions
The municipal unit Lefkimmi is subdivided into the following communities (constituent villages in brackets):
Ano Lefkimmi (Molos)
Lefkimmi (Lefkimmi, Kavos)
Neochori (Neochori, Dragotina, Kritika, Palaiochori, Spartera)
Vitalades (Vitalades, Gardenos)

Population

History
In 1804, when Corfu was part of the Septinsular Republic, 1,300 Souliote refugees arrived in Lefkimmi after their expulsion from their homeland by Ali Pasha of Yanina.

See also
List of settlements in the Corfu regional unit

References

External links
Municipality of Lefkimmi 
Lefkimi Travel and Business Directory 
 Lefkimmi on GTP Travel Pages

 
Populated places in Corfu (regional unit)